Berak (also Romanized as Berāk; also known as Barrāq and Bīraq) is a village in Howmeh Rural District, in the Central District of Larestan County, Fars Province, Iran. At the 2006 census, its population was 2,355, in 559 families.

References 

Populated places in Larestan County